The Men's Aerials event in freestyle skiing at the 2002 Winter Olympics in Salt Lake City, United States took place on 16 and 19 February at Park City.

Results

Qualification
The qualification was held on 16 February at 13:30. The top 12 advanced to the final.

Final
The final was held on 19 February at 12:00.

References

Men's freestyle skiing at the 2002 Winter Olympics
Men's events at the 2002 Winter Olympics